Saudi Arabia competed at the 1976 Summer Olympics in Montreal, Quebec, Canada.

Results by event

Athletics
Men's 800 metres
 Ateyah El-Khashaami
 Heat — 1:57.67 (→ did not advance)

Men's 1,500 metres
 Sheikr Al-Shabani
 Heat — 4:08.70 (→ did not advance)

Men's 5,000 metres
 Shetwy Al-Bishy
 Heat — did not start (→ did not advance, no ranking)

Men's 10,000 metres
 Raga Al-Shalawi
 Heat — did not finish (→ did not advance)

Men's 4x100 metres Relay
Mohammed Sehly, Ali Al-Malky, Salem Khalifa, and Hamed Ali
 Heat — 42.00s (→ did not advance)

Men's 4x400 metres Relay
 Kamil Al-Abbasi, Hamed Ali, Ahmed Asiry, and Hassan Masallam 
 Heat — 3:17.53 (→ did not advance)

Men's 400m Hurdles 
 Kamil Al-Abbasi
 Heat — 55.00s (→ did not advance)

Men's High Jump
 Ghazi Saleh
 Qualification — NM (→ did not advance)

Men's Discus Throw
 Mahmoud Al-Zabramawi
 Qualification — 35.94m (did not advance)

References
Official Olympic Reports

Nations at the 1976 Summer Olympics
1976
1976 in Saudi Arabian sport